George Woodward Warder (May 20, 1848 – February 8, 1907) was a poet, philosopher and author from Missouri, USA.

Life

Warder was a student at the University of Missouri. At the age of eighteen, he was practicing law. He later became a successful lawyer with an interest in banking. In 1878, Warder moved to Kansas City, Missouri, continuing his practice of law as well as other financial enterprises. He invested in real estate and construction.

Books

Warder was also a poet and philosopher. He wrote many books, such as Poetic Fragments, or, College Poems (1873), Eden Dell, or, Love's Wanderings and other Poems (1878), Utopian Dreams and Lotus Leaves (1885) and After Which All Things, or, Footprints and Shadows (1895).

Warder also developed his own cosmology theory. He authored The New Cosmogony (1898), Invisible Light, or Electric Theory of Creation (1899), The Cities of the Sun (1901), The Stairway to the Stars (1902), The Universe a Vast Electric Organism (1903). Warder believed that the universe was an electrical creation and that electricity plays a more important role in the universe than is generally accepted. His views can be seen as a predecessor to plasma cosmology.

References

External links
 
 

1848 births
1907 deaths
People from Richmond, Missouri
American philosophers
American science writers
Pseudoscientific physicists